This is an index list of various lists of LGBT films split by decade, storyline and those made-for-television. Films directed by women, animated films as well as an alphabetical list of such movies are also included.

Films by decade
List of LGBT-related films pre-1920
List of LGBT-related films of the 1920s
List of LGBT-related films of the 1930s
List of LGBT-related films of the 1940s
List of LGBT-related films of the 1950s
List of LGBT-related films of the 1960s
List of LGBT-related films of the 1970s
List of LGBT-related films of the 1980s
List of LGBT-related films of the 1990s
List of LGBT-related films of the 2000s
List of LGBT-related films of the 2010s
List of LGBT-related films of the 2020s

Films by storyline
List of LGBT-related films by storyline

Films made-for-television
List of made-for-television films with LGBT characters

Films directed by women
List of LGBT films directed by women

Animated films
List of animated films with LGBT characters

Alphabetical list
List of LGBT-related films

See also

 LGBT themes in horror fiction
 List of lesbian filmmakers
 List of transgender characters in film and television
 Films about intersex
 Homoeroticism
 Sexuality and gender identity-based cultures
 Straightwashing

External links
 Gay Movies, Gay films list with navigation
 CineQueer, GLAAD's guide to lesbian, gay, bisexual and transgender images in film
 The 28 Best Gay Movies for Rainy Days

 
Lesbian Gay